Microstoria is an experimental electronic ensemble from Düsseldorf, Germany.

Microstoria was founded in 1994 by Markus Popp (of Oval) and Jan St. Werner (of Mouse on Mars). Their first full-length arrived in 1995, released in Europe on the Mille Plateaux label and reissued in America on Thrill Jockey. Three further efforts followed on both labels, and the pair continued working together through 2002. According to Popp, as compared to Oval, "Microstoria does focus much more on the playfulness of the overall approach," incorporating warmer sounds.

Discography
Init Ding (Mille Plateaux/Thrill Jockey, 1995)
snd (Mille Plateaux/Thrill Jockey, 1996)
Reprovisers (Mille Plateaux/Thrill Jockey, 1997)
Model 3, Step 2 (Mille Plateaux/Thrill Jockey, 2000)
Invisible Architecture 3 (Audiosphere Records, 2002)
Improvisers (Sonig Records, 2002)

References
Sean Cooper, [ Microstoria] at Allmusic

German electronic music groups